Appatlo Okadundevadu is a 2016 Indian Telugu-language action crime film written and directed by Saagar K Chandra and produced by Aran Media Works. The film stars Nara Rohit, Sree Vishnu, and debutantes Tanya Hope and Sasha Singh, while Brahmaji and Sasha Singh play supporting roles. The music was composed by Sai Karthik with cinematography by Naveen Yadav and editing by Kotagiri Venkateswara Rao. The film released on 30 December 2016.

The plot follows the life of Railway Raju (Vishnu), an aspiring cricketer who is falsely framed as an Naxalite.

Plot 
Railway Raju, an aspiring cricketer, watches his dream of joining the Indian team going down in flames after he invites the ire of an ambitious police officer. Sadly, he turns to the world of crime.

The story follows the perspectives of various characters that have been a part of Raju’s life in one way or another. Riya, a national level female cricketer turned journalist, goes on a search for the untold story of Raju. She meets Solomon, a close acquaintance of Raju in prison, who narrates her story about how  Raju was an aspiring cricketer. But his life turns upside down when Imtiaz Ali, an honest cop, decides to target him in order to find out the whereabouts of his sister, who turns into a Naxalite.

In a series of events, Raju turns into a gangster and is later split from his pregnant wife and is announced dead after a brawl with Imtiaz. Riya manages to collect bits and pieces of Raju's story and finds out that Raju is still alive. The story ends when we find out that after having lost all hope, Raju put his fortune in a cricket academy which is now famously known as National Cricket Academy, the very academy that has provided extremely talented players to the Indian National team. It is in this stadium that Raju is reunited with his daughter Riya. He looks on and cheers as she smacks a six out of the stadium, and his eyes sparkle with pride.

Cast

Soundtrack

The soundtrack of the film was composed by Sai Karthik and marketed by Aran Music along with Divo on 26 November 2016.

Reception

Critical reception 
The Times of India gave 3.5 out of 5 stars stating "[s]cript and the screenplay are the heroes of this film. Appatlo Okadundevadu is a gripping story, high on action and emotion. A rare feat to achieve and yet delivered effectively."

Suresh Kavirayani writing for Deccan Chronicle, awarded the film three stars and opined, "Appatlo Okadundevadu is an interesting film with an unexpected climax. Director Saagar K Chandra’s neat narration and the way he has handled the cast and the movie certainly speaks volumes about his skill."

References

External links 

2016 films
2010s Telugu-language films
2016 crime action films
2016 action drama films
Indian action drama films
Films about Naxalism
Indian sports drama films
Indian crime action films
Films scored by Sai Karthik
Films about organised crime in India
Indian gangster films
2010s sports drama films
Films directed by Saagar K Chandra